Gramella sabulilitoris is a Gram-negative, aerobic non-spore-forming, rod-shaped and motile bacterium from the genus of Gramella which has been isolated from sand from the Yellow Sea in Korea.

References

Flavobacteria
Bacteria described in 2020